Mouyondzi (can also be written as Muyonzi or Muyondzi) is a town and seat of Mouyondzi District in the Bouenza Region of Congo-Brazzaville. Moyondzi's population mostly consists of Beembe.

The town is served by Mouyondzi Airport.

References
Decalo S., Thompson V. & Adloff R. 1984. Historical dictionary of Congo Pg 218–219. USA: The Scarecrow Press, Inc

Bouenza Department
Populated places in the Republic of the Congo